Sytse Dekama (as well as his successor Gale Hania from Weidum, chosen around 1397) was the twelfth potestaat (or magistrate ruler) of Friesland, which was in the time of the religious disputes between Schieringers and Vetkopers.  There is little known about Sytse Dekama only historian Occo Scarlensis mentions Dekama.  He succeeded Juw Juwinga when he died in 1396.

Potestaats of Friesland